Amyema lisae, is a species of flowering plant, an epiphytic hemiparasitic plant of the family Loranthaceae first discovered in 2017 at Balinsasayao - Twin Lakes Natural Park, in the island of Negros, Philippines. Amyema lisae differs due with verticillate arrangements of leaves and simple umbels in the inflorescences. Its leaves are also relatively smaller leaves. The 5-merous flowers are tomentose and yellow, making it the only mistletoe species in the Philippines to have a yellow flower.

Etymology
The species was named after Lisa J. Paguntalan, executive director Philippine Biodiversity Conservation Foundation Inc. (PBCFI) to honor her contributions to nature conservation in the Philippines.

References

Flora of the Philippines
lisae
Taxa named by Julie F. Barcelona
Taxa named by Pieter B. Pelser
Plants described in 2018